Dajie Town is a town and the county seat of Jiangchuan County in Yunnan province of Southwest China.

Township-level divisions of Yuxi